The British National Party is a far-right political party currently active in Britain.

British National Party may also refer to other far-right parties:
the British National Party (1942), active during the Second World War
the British National Party (1960), active during the 1960s
the British National Party (1970s), led by Eddy Morrison